The 2022 Tampere Open was a professional tennis tournament played on clay courts. It was the 40th edition of the tournament which was part of the 2022 ATP Challenger Tour. It took place in Tampere, Finland, between 18–24 July 2022.

Men's singles main draw entrants

Seeds 

 1 Rankings as of 11 July 2022.

Other entrants 
The following players received wildcards into the singles main draw:
  Leo Borg
  Patrik Niklas-Salminen
  Eero Vasa

The following players received entry into the singles main draw as alternates:
  Lucas Miedler
  Otto Virtanen

The following players received entry from the qualifying draw:
  Moez Echargui
  Arthur Fils
  Harold Mayot
  Luigi Sorrentino
  Clément Tabur
  Juan Bautista Torres

The following player received entry as a lucky loser:
  João Domingues

Champions

Singles

 Zsombor Piros def.  Harold Mayot 6–2, 1–6, 6–4.

Doubles

 Alexander Erler /  Lucas Miedler def.  Karol Drzewiecki /  Patrik Niklas-Salminen 7–6(7–3), 6–1.

References

2022
Tampere Open
Tampere Open
July 2022 sports events in Finland